Military ranks and insignia of Republika Srpska show military rank hierarchy and insignia system in Republika Srpska during existence of Army of Republika Srpska (Војска Републике Српскe, Vojska Republike Srpske) from May 12, 1992 to January 1, 2006, when it was merged into Armed Forces of Bosnia and Herzegovina. In period of existence of Army of Republika Srpska there was three periods of changing ranks: 
 Period of same as YPA ranks (1992–1997),
 Period of first change and modernization (1997–2000) and
 Last changes before merging into Armed Forces of Bosnia and Herzegovina (2000–2006).

1992–1997 

 
This period is considered as war-time and post-war. Ranks in these period are first military ranks in Republika Srpska.
During war and because of link between Army of Republika Srpksa and Yugoslav People's Army, these two armies had identical ranks system. Army almost always used field ranks because of situation and the fact that it was worn only combat uniform by soldiers and officers. According to Article 4 of "Decision of founding Army of Serb Republic of Bosnia and Herzegovina" on May 12, 1992 ranks were same as in YPA: 
 for soldiers: vojnik (private), razvodnik (lance corporal), desetar (corporal) and mlađi vodnik (junior sergeant),
 for non-commissioned officers: vodnik (sergeant), vodnik prve klase (sergeant first class), stariji vodnik (senior sergeant), stariji vodnik prve klase (first sergeant), zastavnik (warrant officer), zastavnik prve klase (chief warrant officer), 
 for officers: potporučnik (second lieutenant), poručnik (lieutenant), kapetan (captain), kapetan prve klase (senior captain), major (major), potpukovnik (lieutenant colonel), pukovnik (colonel) and
 for generals: general-major (major general), general-potpukovnik (lieutenant colonel general), general-pukovnik (colonel general) and general vojske (army general).

Ranks were worn on combat uniform above the left breast pocket on part of canvas with velcro behind. Above the rank it was a insignia of branch. Usually high officers had it on their ranks.

Insignia on uniform was round-shaped flag with Cyrillic title Army of Republika Srpska (Војска Републике Српске, translit. Vojska Republike Srpske) worn on left arm.

Generals and officers (1992-1997)

Non-commissioned officers (1992-1997)

1997–2000 
After the war, the Army of Republika Srpska's administration modernized the look of ranks in the army. Despite a more modern design, they incorporated style elements and names according to Serbian military tradition and history. One change was that general ranks changed names (general to đeneral). The new ranks came into effect in 1997, when new uniforms came into service. Ranks from that period were:
 for soldiers: vojnik (private), vojnik prve klase (1st class private) and mlađi vodnik (junior sergeant),
 for non-commissioned officers: vodnik (sergeant), stariji vodnik (senior sergeant), zastavnik (warrant officer),
 for officers: poručnik (lieutenant), kapetan (captain), major (major), potpukovnik (lieutenant colonel), pukovnik (colonel),
 for generals: đeneral-major (major general), đeneral-potpukovnik (lieutenant colonel general), đeneral-pukovnik (colonel general) and đeneral Vojske (army general).

Generals and officers (1997–2000)

Non-commissioned officers (1997–2000)

See also 
 Army of Republika Srpska

References 

Army of Republika Srpska
Republika Srpska